Mohammad Rizwan Aslam (born 23 February 1975) is a former Pakistani first-class and List A cricketer, who has over 1200 first-class runs to his name. He is a left-handed batsman and right-arm off break bowler.

Domestic career 
Aslam's brief domestic career included seven half-centuries and two centuries, with both of the centuries and five half-centuries being scored in first-class matches, while the rest in List A matches.

At domestic level, he played in 24 first-class and 12 List A matches representing the Lahore cricket teams and Sargodha. He made his first-class debut for Lahore City on 20 November 1999 during the 1999–2000 Quaid-e-Azam Trophy, while he made his List A debut for Sargodha on 10 April 1999 during the 1998–99 Tissot Cup.

In December 2002, Aslam slammed his career best knock of unbeaten 209 runs playing for Lahore Whites against Gujranwala during the 2002–03 Quaid-e-Azam Trophy, which helped the Whites to win over Gujranwala at a big margin. He was also the second highest run-scorer for Lahore Whites in that tournament, aggregating 295 runs.

See also 

 List of Allied Bank Limited cricketers
 List of Sargodha cricketers

References

External links 

 

1975 births
Living people
Allied Bank Limited cricketers
Lahore cricketers
Pakistani cricketers
Cricketers from Lahore